The Indonesia men's national field hockey team is made up of the best field hockey players in Indonesia. As of 20 December 2022, the team is ranked 77th in the world, and 18th in Asia, by the International Hockey Federation. The governing body for the sports is the Indonesia Hockey Federation.

Competition history
A red box around the year indicates tournaments played within Indonesia and best results"

Asian Games

Asia Cup

AHF Cup

Southeast Asian Games

Coaches

See also
Indonesia women's national field hockey team

References

External links
FIH profile

Asian men's national field hockey teams
Field hockey
National team